Eastland v. United States Servicemen's Fund, 421 U.S. 491 (1975), was a United States Supreme Court case that defined the limits of Congress's authority to issues subpoenas. In an 8–1 decision, the court found that Congress was within its constitutional powers to issue a subpoena for the banking records of the United States Servicemen's Fund.

Background

James Eastland was a Democratic senator from Mississippi, who supported American involvement in the Vietnam War and chaired the Senate Subcommittee on Internal Security. The United States Servicemen's Fund (USSF) was a non-profit organization that was outspoken in its opposition to the war.

Eastland's committee subpoenaed the USSF's banking records.

Consequences
Eastland v. United States Servicemen's Fund was cited in court cases involving the Tax returns of Donald Trump. Trump claimed that Congress had exceeded its authority in subpoenaing the returns.

References

External links
 

1975 in United States case law
United States Supreme Court cases
United States Supreme Court cases of the Burger Court